The 1974 Pot Black was a professional invitational snooker tournament, which was held in the Pebble Mill Studios in Birmingham, and featured eight professional players. All matches were one-frame shoot-outs.

Broadcasts were on BBC2 and started at 21:00 on Tuesday 5 February 1974  Alan Weeks presented the programme with Ted Lowe as commentator and Sydney Lee as referee.

The tournament was contested by 8 players in two round-robin groups of 4 with the top two players from each group qualifying for the semi-finals.  This year's tournament featured the debuts of Cliff Thorburn and Graham Miles who went on to win the Pot Black title at the first attempt beating John Spencer in the final. For the first time the final was decided on aggregate score over two frames, shown on 14 and 21 May, Miles won both frames, 77–37 and 70–49, winning by a score of 147–86.

Main draw

League 1

League 2

Knockout stage

References

Pot Black
1974 in snooker
1974 in English sport